Samīra al-Māni' (born 1935) is an Iraqi writer.

Biography 
Samīra al-Māni' was born in Basra and received a BA in Arabic literature from the University of Baghdad. She moved to London in 1965 and earned a diploma in librarianship from Ealing Technical College there in 1976. 

In 1985, she co-founded al-Ightirab al-adabi (Arabic: الإغتراب الأدبي, al-ʾiġtirāb al-ʾadabī, Literature in Exile), a literary journal for Iraqi exiles. She participated in the International Writing Program at Iowa University in 1990. In that same year, she also attended the International Festival of Authors in Toronto. Her short stories have been translated into English and Dutch.

Literary work 
Her work often depicts Arab women attempting to adapt to life in other countries.

Life 
She is married to Salah Niazi the Iraqi poet; the couple have two daughters.

Selected works 
 al-Sabiqun wa-l-lahiqun ("The First and the Last"), novel (1972)
 al-Ghina''' ("Singing"),  short stories (1976)
 al-Thuna'iya al-Lunduniya ("A London Sequel"), novel (1979)
 Hab! al-surra,  novel (1990), published in English as Umbilical Cord (2005)
 al-Nisf faqat ("Only A Half"), play (1994), staged at the International Centre for Women Playwrights in Buffalo
 al-Qami'un ("The Oppressors"), novel (1997)
 al-Ruh wa ghayruha'' ("The Spirit and Other Things"), short stories (1999)

References

External links 
 

1935 births
Living people
University of Baghdad alumni
Iraqi women writers
Iraqi writers
20th-century Iraqi novelists
Iraqi dramatists and playwrights
Iraqi short story writers
International Writing Program alumni
British people of Iraqi descent
21st-century Iraqi novelists